The Claro River is a river of Chile  located in the Maule Region. It rises in the Andes, at the confluence of the Los Cajones River and Del Planchón River. It empties into the Teno River near the city of Los Queñes.

In February 1991, eruptions from the volcanic complex of Planchón-Peteroa (Planchón (3977 m) and Peteroa (4101 m)) 35 km southeast Los Queñes contaminated the water and killed large numbers of fish.

It was the former training site of the U.S. Olympic slalom kayak team.

See also
List of rivers of Chile

Notes

References
 https://web.archive.org/web/20151123130725/http://www.sinia.cl/1292/articles-46115_recurso_teno.pdf
 http://oldpirates.net/Chile/Teno/old_pirates_chile_ct-d.htm

Rivers of Chile
Rivers of Maule Region